Applicable throughout Papua New Guinea, a speed-limit of 60kmh (37 mph) applies in town areas (built-up areas), unless otherwise indicated by speed control signage applicable to a specific road.

Outside built-up areas, a 75kmh speed-limit (47 mph) applies to highways, unless otherwise indicated.

Papua New Guinea does not use 'end speed-limit' signage (used globally to fall to a regulated rural default speed limit), or 'speed derestriction' signs (to cease all speed restrictions).  Any signposted limit outside the two speed-limits listed above, apply only to the specific length of road which it is signposted, its stated speed restriction ending at - the end of the particular road itself (T-intersection or dead-end, the end of the road), or at another speed restriction sign.

Papua New Guinea is a contracting party to 'The UN Convention on Road Traffic' (1949), as of 12 February 1981.

Speed restriction signage used in PNG is to the international system in design.

Papua New Guinea
Road transport in Papua New Guinea